NGC 270 is a lenticular galaxy in the constellation Cetus. It was discovered on December 10, 1798 by William Herschel.

References

External links
 

0270
Lenticular galaxies
Cetus (constellation)
002938
Discoveries by William Herschel
-02-03-027